The 2019 American Athletic Conference men's soccer tournament was the 7th edition of the American Athletic Conference Men's Soccer Tournament. The tournament decided the American Athletic Conference champion and guaranteed representative into the 2019 NCAA Division I men's soccer tournament. The tournament began on November 9 and concluded on November 16. For the first time in tournament history the six teams in the field were identical to the same teams that played in the previous year's tournament.

Two-time defending champions, SMU, successfully three-peated in the AAC Tournament, defeating UCF 1–0 in the championship.

Seeds

Bracket

Results

First round

Semifinals

Final

Statistics

Top goalscorers 
3 Goals
  Cal Jennings – UCF
2 Goals
  Adrian Billhardt – South Florida
1 Goal

  Sam Ashton – Memphis
  Jalen Campbell – Temple
  Itzik Efraim – UCF
  Nicky Hernandez – SMU
  Eddie Munjoma – SMU
  Esteban Suarez – Temple
  Brandon Terwege – SMU
  Mauricio Villalobos – UCF

Awards and honors 
 Tournament Offensive MVP: Eddie Munjoma
 Tournament Defensive MVP: Grant Makela

All-Tournament team:

 Adrian Billhardt, South Florida
 Pierre Cayet, Temple
 Cal Jennings, UCF
 Yannik Oettl, UCF
 Louis Perez, UCF
 Gino Vivi, UCF

 Gabriel Costa, SMU
 Grant Makela, SMU
 Eddie Munjoma, SMU
 Brandon Terwege, SMU
 Nicky Hernandez, SMU

References

External links 
 2019 AAC Men's Soccer Championship Central

Tournament
American Athletic Conference men's soccer
American Athletic Conference Men's Soccer Tournament
American Athletic Conference Men's Soccer Tournament
American Athletic Conference Men's Soccer Tournament
American Athletic Conference Men's Soccer Tournament